Jim McDonald (born 24 June 1916, date of death unknown) was an Australian rules footballer who played with Melbourne in the Victorian Football League (VFL).

Notes

External links 
		

Demonwiki profile

1916 births
Year of death missing
Australian rules footballers from Victoria (Australia)
Melbourne Football Club players
Leongatha Football Club players